Lucky Luciano is a 1973 Italian/French/US international co-production crime film about the Sicilian-American gangster Charles “Lucky” Luciano, played by Gian Maria Volonté. It is directed by Francesco Rosi, and written by Rosi, Tonino Guerra, Lino Iannuzzi, and Jerome Chodorov. The cast also stars Rod Steiger, Vincent Gardenia, Charles Cioffi, and Edmond O'Brien. Charles Siragusa, the real-life federal narcotics agent who pursued Luciano, plays himself in the film and also served as technical consultant. The film is a French and Italian co-production, filmed on-location in Italy and New York City.

Lucky Luciano was shown as part of the Cannes Classics section of the 2013 Cannes Film Festival.

Plot
Born in Sicily as Salvatore Lucania, Charles “Lucky” Luciano rises to become “the boss of all bosses” of the American Mafia in the 1930s by eliminating his rivals for power. When eventually imprisoned, Luciano eventually secures his release by offering his services to military intelligence during World War II, receiving a commutation from New York Governor Thomas E. Dewey and subsequently being deported to Italy.

Settling in Naples, Luciano takes control of the underground drug trade, managing to avoid prosecution through the use of proxies, covertly running his operation out of a race track. Federal Bureau of Narcotics agent Charles Siragusa is assigned to bring down Luciano, managing to turn his associate Gene Giannini informant. Giannini tries to lure Luciano out of the country to Marseilles, but Luciano refuses to talk business.

When Giannini fails to get Siragusa the results he wants, he allows the informant to spend a year in an Italian jail for carrying counterfeit currency. Giannini attempts to contact Siragusa by sending letters through his mistress, but she has begun an affair with Luciano who reads their contents and learns of his friend's double-dealing. Siragusa sends Giannini back to the United States to testify against Luciano, but he's assassinated on Luciano's orders before he can do so. Siragusa's superiors order him to halt his investigation. He accuses them of trying to cover for Dewey, claiming that he only commuted Luciano after the mobster bribed him, though they deny it.

By 1962, dozens of Luciano's associates in the drug trade have been arrested. The Italian authorities detain him and reveal they have discovered his smuggling scheme. Under immense stress, Luciano falls ill but seemingly recovers. Police tail him to the airport where he is to meet with a filmmaker writing a screenplay about his life, but he suffers a fatal heart attack and dies.

Style 
Like Rosi's previous film The Mattei Affair, the film is presented in a docudrama style representing Rosi's notion of cine-inchieste (film investigation), avoiding the personal aspects of the biopic or gangster genre and focusing on the researched facts of Luciano's life and activities, and their broader implications.

Cast

Gian Maria Volonté as Charles “Lucky” Luciano
Charles Siragusa as himself, a U.S. narcotics agent
Rod Steiger as Gene Giannini
Edmond O'Brien as Harry J. Anslinger
Vincent Gardenia as Colonel Poletti
Silverio Blasi as Italian Commissario
Larry Gates as Judge Herlands
Magda Konopka as Contessa
Dino Curcio as Don Ciccio
Karin Petersen as Igea Lissoni
Jacques Monod as French Commissioner
Luigi Infantino as opera singer
Carlo Mazzarella as radio journalist
John Francis Lane as reporter in Naples
P. M. Pasinetti as the narrator

Source:

See also
 List of Italian films of 1973
 List of French films of 1973

References

External links

1973 films
1973 crime drama films
Italian crime drama films
Italian biographical films
French crime drama films
French biographical films
1970s Italian-language films
English-language French films
English-language Italian films
French multilingual films
Italian multilingual films
Biographical films about gangsters
Cultural depictions of Lucky Luciano
Cultural depictions of Vito Genovese
Films directed by Francesco Rosi
Films set in 1962
Films set in Naples
Films set in Palermo
Films set in the 1950s
Films set in New York City
Films about the American Mafia
Films with screenplays by Tonino Guerra
Embassy Pictures films
Films scored by Piero Piccioni
Italian docudrama films
French docudrama films
American docudrama films
1970s American films
1970s Italian films
1970s French films
Italian gangster films
American gangster films
French gangster films